Cedrus, common English name cedar, is a genus of coniferous trees in the plant family Pinaceae (subfamily Abietoideae).  They are native to the mountains of the western Himalayas and the Mediterranean region, occurring at altitudes of 1,500–3,200 m in the Himalayas and 1,000–2,200 m in the Mediterranean.

Description

Cedrus trees can grow up to 30–40 m (occasionally 60 m) tall with spicy-resinous scented wood, thick ridged or square-cracked bark, and broad, level branches.  The shoots are dimorphic and are made up of long shoots, which form the framework of the branches, and short shoots, which carry most of the leaves.  The leaves are evergreen and needle-like, 8–60 mm long, arranged in an open spiral phyllotaxis on long shoots, and in dense spiral clusters of 15–45 together on short shoots; they vary from bright grass-green to dark green to strongly glaucous pale blue-green, depending on the thickness of the white wax layer which protects the leaves from desiccation.  The seed cones are barrel-shaped, 6–12 cm long and 3–8 cm broad, green maturing grey-brown, and, as in Abies, disintegrate at maturity to release the winged seeds.  The seeds are 10–15 mm long, with a 20–30 mm wing; as in Abies, the seeds have two or three resin blisters, containing an unpleasant-tasting resin, thought to be a defence against squirrel predation.  Cone maturation takes one year, with pollination in autumn and the seeds maturing the same time a year later.  The pollen cones are slender ovoid, 3–8 cm long, produced in late summer, and shedding pollen in autumn.

Taxonomy
Cedars share a very similar cone structure with the firs (Abies) and were traditionally thought to be most closely related to them, but molecular evidence supports a basal position in the family.

Taxa

The five taxa of Cedrus are assigned according to taxonomic opinion to between one and four species: The oldest known fossil of Cedrus is Cedrus penzhinaensis known from fossil wood found in Early Cretaceous (Albian) sediments of Kamchatka, Russia.

Ecology
Cedars are adapted to mountainous climates; in the Mediterranean, they receive winter precipitation, mainly as snow, and summer drought, while in the western Himalaya, they receive primarily summer monsoon rainfall and occasional winter snowfall.  While no members of Cedrus are native to the  Americas, members of Juniperus and Cupressaceae are native and called by the common name of "cedar".

Cedars are used as food plants by the larvae of some Lepidoptera species including pine processionary and turnip moth (recorded on deodar cedar).

Use

Cedars are very popular ornamental trees, and are often cultivated in temperate climates where winter temperatures do not fall below circa −25 °C.  The Turkish cedar is slightly hardier, to −30 °C or just below.  Extensive mortality of planted specimens can occur in severe winters when temperatures fall lower. Locales with successful longaeval cultivation include the Mediterranean region, western Europe north to the British Isles, southern Australia and New Zealand, and southern and western North America.

Cedar wood and cedarwood oil are natural repellents to moths, hence cedar is a popular lining for cedar chests and closets in which woolens are stored. This specific use of cedar is mentioned in The Iliad, Book 24, referring to the cedar-roofed or lined storage chamber where Priam went to fetch treasures to be used as ransom. The ancients made cedarwood oil from Lebanon cedar, a true cedar of the genus Cedrus,  However, the species used for modern cedar chests and closets in North America is Juniperus virginiana, and cedarwood oil is now typically derived from various junipers and cypresses (of the family Cupressaceae). Cedar is also commonly used to make shoe trees because it can absorb moisture and deodorize.

Many species of cedar are suitable for training as bonsai. They work well for many styles, including formal and informal upright, slanting, and cascading.

Nomenclature
Some authorities consider Cedrus the only "true cedars"  and discourage use of the name for other genera without an additional qualifier, such as "white-cedar". Nevertheless, the name "cedar" has been applied (since about 1700) to other trees, such as the North American Thuja plicata, commonly called "western red cedar", and Juniperus virginiana, commonly called "red cedar" or "eastern red cedar".  In some cases, the botanical name alludes to this usage, such as the genus Calocedrus, meaning "beautiful cedar" (also known as "incense cedar").  Several species of genera Calocedrus, Thuja, and Chamaecyparis in the Pacific Northwest having similarly aromatic wood are referred to as "false cedars" .

Etymology
Both the Latin word cedrus and the generic name cedrus are derived from Greek κέδρος kédros.  Ancient Greek and Latin used the same word, kédros and cedrus, respectively, for different species of plants now classified in the genera Cedrus and Juniperus (juniper).  Species of both genera are native to the area where Greek language and culture originated, though as the word kédros does not seem to be derived from any of the languages of the Middle East, it has been suggested the word may originally have applied to Greek species of juniper and was later adopted for species now classified in the genus Cedrus because of the similarity of their aromatic woods.  The name was similarly applied to citron and the word citrus is derived from the same root.  However, as a loan word in English, cedar had become fixed to its biblical sense of Cedrus by the time of its first recorded usage in AD 1000.

See also
 List of plants known as cedar
 Cedars of God in the Kadisha Valley of Bsharri, Lebanon

References

External links

 Cedar of Meudon: A tree in Meudon near Paris that has fascinated people through time

 
Conifer genera
Ornamental trees
Plants used in bonsai
Wood